Cuevas or Cueva (Spanish for "cave(s)") may refer to:

Places
 Cueva de Ágreda, a municipality located in the province of Soria, Castile and León, Spain 
 Cuevas Bajas, a town and municipality in the province of Málaga, part of the autonomous community of Andalusia in southern Spain  
 Cuevas de Almudén, a town in the province of Teruel, Aragón, Spain 
 Cuevas del Almanzora, a municipality of Almería province, in the autonomous community of Andalusia, Spain
 Cuevas del Becerro, a town and municipality in the province of Málaga, part of the autonomous community of Andalusia in southern Spain
 Cuevas del Valle, a municipality in the province of Ávila, Castile and León, Spain
 Cuevas de Provanco, a municipality in the province of Segovia, Castile and León, Spain
 Cuevas de San Clemente, a municipality in the province of Burgos, Castile and León, Spain 
 Cuevas de San Marcos, a town and municipality in the province of Málaga
 Cuevas de Vera, a town in south-eastern Spain, on the right bank of the river Almanzora 
 Cuevas Labradas, a town in the province of Teruel, Aragón, Spain

Caves
 Cueva de La Pasiega, a cave in the Spanish municipality of Puente Viesgo
 Cueva de las Manos, a cave in Santa Cruz Province, Argentina
 Cueva de los Casares, a cave in Guadalajara, Spain
 La Cueva del Indio, a cave in Puerto Rico, site of petroglyphs
 Cueva de los Verdes, a cave in the Canary Islands
 Cuevas de El Castillo or the Cave of El Castillo, an archaeological site within the complex of the Caverns of Monte Castillo 
 Cuevas de Sorbas, limestone caves in Sorbas, Almeria, Spain

Other uses 
 Cueva people, an extinct indigenous people exterminated in the 16th century
 La Cueva High School, a public high school located in northeast Albuquerque, New Mexico
 Salamanca, cave that appears in numerous Hispanic American legends.

People with the surname

Athletes
 Casandra Cuevas
 Christian Cueva, Peruvian football (soccer) player
 José "Pipino" Cuevas, Mexican boxer
 Juan Cuevas, an Argentinian football (soccer) forward 
 Nelson Cuevas, Paraguayan football (soccer) player
 Pablo Cuevas, Uruguayan tennis player
 William Cuevas, Venezuelan professional baseball pitcher

Artists
 Aida Cuevas, Mexican ranchera singer
 Carlos Cuevas, Spanish actor
 George de Cuevas, Chilean-born ballet impresario and choreographer
 José Luis Cuevas, Mexican painter and sculptor
 Juan Martín Cueva, Ecuadorian documentary film director
 Juan de la Cueva, Spanish dramatist and poet
 Beto Cuevas, the former lead singer of the now-defunct Chilean rock band, La Ley
 Manuel Cuevas, a costume designer for Rock and Roll and Country and Western singers
 Minerva Cuevas, a Mexican conceptual artist
 Patricio Cueva Jaramillo, Ecuadorian painter and journalist
 Sal Cuevas, bassist for Ray Barreto and the Fania All-Stars
 Sofía Cancino de Cuevas (1897–1982), Mexican composer, pianist, opera promoter, singer and symphonic conductor

Politicians
 Alfonso de la Cueva, marqués de Bedmar, Spanish diplomat and bishop
 Nora Cuevas (born 1959), Chilean public politician
 Carlos Cueva Tamaríz, Ecuadorian politician, lawyer and professor 
 Fernando Cordero Cueva, Ecuadorian politician and architect
 Gabriela Cuevas Barron, Mexican politician affiliated to the National Action Party (PAN)
 Luis Carvajal y de la Cueva, Portuguese-born Sephardi gobernador of Nuevo León
 Arlene Stringer-Cuevas (1933-2020), American politician

Other
Altamiro de la Cueva, fictional character in a Spanish comic
Andres Cuevas, Australian engineer
Elvira Cuevas, Puerto Rican ecologist
María Luisa Cuevas Rodríguez, Spanish chess master

See also
 Las Cuevas (disambiguation)